Fairid Naparin is an Indonesian politician and incumbent mayor of Palangka Raya city since 2018. He was elected on 24 September 2018 during 2018 Indonesian local elections.

References 

1985 births
People from Banjarmasin
Golkar politicians
Mayors of places in Indonesia
Mayors and regents of places in Central Kalimantan
Living people